Stewart Sound Islands are a group of islands of the Andaman Islands.  It belongs to the North and Middle Andaman administrative district, part of the Indian union territory of Andaman and Nicobar Islands.

Geography
Important islands: Aves, Stewart, Sound (the largest and highest island, at 147 metres), Curlew, Blister, Gurjan, Dotrel, Oliver, Orchid, Egg, Gander, Oyster, Square, Swamp, Karlo, Goose.

Demographics 
There are 2 villages, on Stewart and Aves.

References 

Islands of the Andaman and Nicobar Islands